The siege of Alexandria was a series of skirmishes and battles occurring between the forces of Julius Caesar, Cleopatra VII, Arsinoe IV, and Ptolemy XIII, between 48 and 47 BC. During this time Caesar was engaged in a civil war against remaining Republican forces.

The siege was lifted by relief forces arriving from Syria. After a battle contesting those forces' crossing of the Nile delta, Ptolemy XIII and Arsinoe's forces were defeated.

Events

Prelude 
After the Battle of Pharsalus, Pompey abandoned his defeated army and fled with his advisors overseas to Mytilene and thence to Cilicia where he held a council of war. Pompey's council of war decided to flee to Egypt, which had in the previous year supplied him with military aid.

Upon his arrival in Egypt, he was murdered by Achillas and Lucius Septimius, former soldiers in his army, under the orders of the eunuch Pothinus and Theodotus of Chios, advisors of the King Ptolemy who believed Caesar would be pleased by the removal of his adversary.

Caesar landed in Alexandria three days after Pompey's death with some three thousand men and eight hundred Germanic auxiliary horse, arrogantly occupying parts of the Alexandrian royal quarter. Caesar was horrified, or pretended to be so, at the murder of Pompey, and wept for his one-time ally and son-in-law. He demanded a ten million denarii payment towards a debt of Ptolemy's father, Ptolemy XII Auletes, and declared his intention to mediate the dispute between Ptolemy and his sister Cleopatra VII.

Start of the siege 
After the payment demand, Pothinus sent secret orders summoning Achillas and an army of some twenty thousand men to Alexandria, where they besieged and then launched an all-out attack on the Royal Quarter. Initial fighting was fierce, with an accidental fire spreading to the famous Library of Alexandria, though damage to the library was likely minimal. During the siege, Cleopatra secreted herself into the Royal Quarter and eventually became Caesar's lover. Around the time the relationship started, Caesar also declared that he viewed Ptolemy XII Auletes's will to invest both Cleopatra and Ptolemy XIII with joint rule over the kingdom. Ptolemy XIII was not impressed with the decision, "probably already aware that his sister was closer to the Roman consul [Caesar] than he could ever be" and incited a Alexandrian riot against Caesar.

After one of Caesar's slaves discovered communications between Pothinus and the besiegers, Caesar had Pothinus executed.

Meanwhile, Arsinoe IV, the younger sister of Ptolemy, escaped from Caesar and joined the Egyptian army, which proclaimed her queen. She arranged successfully with her eunuch tutor Ganymede the murder of Achillas and then assumed command of the army, renewing the siege. Caesar's water supplies were contaminated, forcing him to dig wells. Reinforcements from his Thirty-seventh legion, a former Pompeian formation, also then arrived by sea bringing supplies and artillery.

Naval battle

Soon after the siege began Caesar made a sally against the Great Harbor and burned the Alexandrian fleet, damaging the Great Library in the process. Ganymedes ordered the Alexandrians to repair as many ships as possible. They readied 27 warships for battle. Caesar unwilling to give up his naval superiority drew up his own fleet, 19 warships and 15 smaller vessels, in two lines just north of the coast of Pharos Island. Ganymedes sailed out from the Eunostos Harbor and formed two lines opposite Caesar's fleet. Between the two fleets were shoals, a narrow channel being the only way through. Both sides eventually held their position, neither wanting to make the initial move. 

Euphranor, the commander of Caesar's Rhodian allies, convinced Caesar that he and his men could push through and hold for long enough to let the rest of the fleet pass through the channel. Four Rhodian ships sailed through the channel and formed a line against the Alexandrian ships rapidly closing in, delaying them long enough for the rest of Caesar's fleet to pass through. With the channel to his back Caesar needed to win because retreat would be disastrous. Though the Alexandrians were excellent sailors the Romans had a deciding advantage: because of the proximity of the coast and the shoals there was little room for manoeuvre. The ships were forced into close combat, something the Romans excelled at. Two Alexandrian ships were captured, three more were sunk, and the rest fled back to the Eunostos.

Battle for Pharos 

After winning the battle for naval supremacy Caesar turned his attention to Pharos Island. The island was crucial for controlling access into the harbors and was linked to the mainland through a bridge, the Heptastadium, connected by two moles, one from the island and one from the mainland. Caesar had stationed a small garrison on the northeastern part of the island opposite the Lighthouse of Alexandria. He ordered ten cohorts of legionaries, some light infantry and his Gallic cavalry to board their transports and led them on an amphibious assault of the island while his garrison on the island attacked the Alexandrians simultaneously. 

After a hard-fought battle the Alexandrians retreated from the island. Caesar fortified defences around the bridge controlling access to the Pharos, the Alexandrians doing the same on the mainland. The bridge had a large arch through which the Alexandrians could send ships to attack Caesar's transports. To stop the Alexandrians from doing this Caesar needed to take control of the bridge. The day after taking the island he sent several ships with archers and artillery to clear the bridge and he then landed with three cohorts on the bridge. He ordered his men to start constructing a rampart on the bridge while men from the Pharos brought up stones to block the arch. The Alexandrians suddenly launched a two-pronged counterattack by land and sea to take the bridge back. Caesar's captains decided to take the initiative themselves by landing archers and slingers on the bridge to fend off the enemy ships. The Alexandrians, however, landed their troops behind them and attacked them from the rear. Caesar's light troops were quickly outfought by the heavily armed Alexandrian soldiers. Caesar was now caught in a pincer and ordered his troops to withdraw to their transports. 

In the panic, Caesar's craft was swamped by soldiers, forcing him to remove his armour and then swim to shore, holding his left hand above water to save some important documents. The battle ended in defeat; although Pharos Island was still in Caesar's hands, the bridge was not. He had lost some eight hundred men (about half legionnaires and half sailors) but morale remained high and Caesar's men continued to repulse enemy attacks.

Arrival of relief army
Soon after the skirmish for Pharos, a deputation from the Alexandrians asked Caesar to exchange Arsinoe for Ptolemy XIII, claiming a general weariness with the despotic rule of Arsinoe and Ganymede. Ptolemy XIII, feigning fear of being sent away, was released; he promptly joined his sister and urged his soldiers to continue the attack on Caesar. Contemporaries viewed this in satirical terms, saying "Caesar's excessive kindness was made absurd by the deceit of a boy".

Renewed assaults on Roman positions were unsuccessful. The situation began to turn in Caesar's favour when news reached him in March 47 BC of a relief force arriving overland from Syria under Mithridates of Pergamum at the head of an allied army with a detachment of three thousand Jews contributed by High Priest Hyrcanus II and led by Antipater the Idumaean. The Jewish detachment encouraged the Jewish population of Alexandria to become more sympathetic to Caesar and after Mithridates' forces stormed Pelusium, Ptolemy XIII's forces redeployed east to contest Mithridates' crossing of the Nile.

References

Sources 
 
 
 
 

40s BC conflicts
47 BC
Alexandria (47 BC)
Alexandria (47 BC)
Ptolemaic Alexandria
Cleopatra
Julius Caesar
1st century BC in the Roman Republic
1st century BC in Egypt

de:Alexandrinischer Krieg
pl:Oblężenie Aleksandrii